Lena Like Latin ( Lena Goes Latin) is a 1963 studio album by Lena Horne, arranged by Shorty Rogers and Marty Paich. Recorded in Hollywood in July 1963 and released in the summer of 1963 on the Chater label. The album was reissued on CD in 2008 by Fresh Sound Records, together with the album Lena Horne Sings Your Requests. The CD issue featured a bonus track "He Loves Me" that was previously only issued on 45rpm single.

Track listing
 "From This Moment On" (Cole Porter) – 1:52
 "Take Me" (Mack David, Rube Bloom) – 2:23
 "Night and Day" (Porter) – 2:41
 "Old Devil Moon" (Yip Harburg, Burton Lane) – 2:39
"More (Theme From Mondo Cane)" (Riz Ortolani, Nino Oliviero, Marcello Ciorciolini, Norman Newell) – 1:43
 "My Blue Heaven" (George A. Whiting, Walter Donaldson) – 2:25
 "Cuckoo in the Clock" (Johnny Mercer, Donaldson) – 3:34
 "Meditation" (Antônio Carlos Jobim, Norman Gimbel, Newton Mendonça) – 2:19
 "By Myself" (Howard Dietz, Arthur Schwartz) – 2:44
 "Island in the West Indies" (Ira Gershwin, Vernon Duke) – 2:21
 "Ours" (Porter) – 2:48
 "Falling In Love with Love" (Lorenz Hart, Richard Rodgers) – 2:02

CD bonus track
13. "He Loves Me" (Jerry Bock, Sheldon Harnick) - 1:53

Personnel
Performance
Lena Horne – vocals
Lennie Hayton – arranger, conductor, orchestration
Shorty Rogers, Marty Paich - arranger
Production
Ken Whitmore - photography
Dick Peirce - producer

References

1963 albums
Lena Horne albums
Albums arranged by Marty Paich
Albums arranged by Shorty Rogers
Albums conducted by Lennie Hayton
Albums arranged by Lennie Hayton